William Jones Boone (1 July 181117 July 1864) was the first Episcopalian missionary bishop of China and Japan and the first bishop of China outside the Roman tradition.

Life
Boone was born in Walterboro, South Carolina, graduated from the College of South Carolina in 1829 and was admitted to the bar in 1833. He then attended Virginia Theological Seminary and was ordained deacon on 18 September 1836 and priest on 3 March 1837.

Missionary work in China
Under the auspices of the Protestant Episcopal Church Mission (PECM, also called the American Church Mission), Boone was appointed a missionary to China on 17 January 1837. Accompanied by his wife Amelia he commenced his journey to China from Boston on 8 July 1837 reaching Batavia on 22 October the same year. In Batavia he studied alongside the priests Henry Lockwood and Francis Hanson to gain a degree of fluency in the Chinese language.

Prior to the conclusion of the First Opium War Boone relocated to Macau in 1840. In February 1842 conditions in China were considered secure enough for Boone to relocate his missionary work to Kulangsu, a small island half a mile from the recently opened treaty port of Amoy, to set up the first base for the Episcopalians.

On a return visit the United States Boone was consecrated at St. Peter's Church, Philadelphia on 26 October 1844 as the first Anglican missionary bishop of China and Japan (under later bishops, the missionary district was reduced and called Shanghai) and the first bishop of China outside the Roman tradition. Influenced by British CMS missionary George Smith he chose to relocate the center of his mission work to Shanghai in 1845 where he served until his death in 1864.

Boone was responsible for the recruitment of numerous missionaries; notably Emma Jones, Henry M. Parker and Channing Moore Williams his eventual successor as Bishop of China nad Japan. Boone with others is credited with the translation of the Book of Common Prayer into Chinese and also contributed to a Chinese translation of the Bible. He also ordained the first Chinese priest, Huang Guangcai (Chinese: 黃光彩, 1827–96) in 1851.

Family
He married Sarah Amelia deSaussure who died at Amoy in 1842.  His second wife was Phobe Caroline Elliott. Boone's son, also named William Jones Boone, also served as a Missionary Bishop of Shanghai in the Episcopal Church.

Consecrators
 Philander Chase, 1st bishop of Ohio and 1st bishop of Illinois
 George Washington Doane, 2nd bishop of New Jersey
 James Hervey Otey, 1st bishop of Tennessee
William Jones Boone was the 45th bishop consecrated for the Episcopal Church.

See also

 Address in Behalf of the China Mission, By the Rev. William J. Boone, M.D., Missionary of the Protestant Episcopal Church of the United States of America to China.
 Episcopal Church Office of Liturgy and Music: William Jones Boone

References

1811 births
1864 deaths
Translators of the Bible into Chinese
People from Walterboro, South Carolina
Episcopal bishops of Shanghai
19th-century Anglican bishops in China
19th-century American translators
Virginia Theological Seminary alumni
University of South Carolina alumni